ELC may refer to:

Education 
 Eastside Lutheran College, in Warrane, Tasmania, Australia
 ELC English Language Center, an American language school
 elc International School, in Selangor, Malaysia
 eLearning Credits, an initiative of the Government of the United Kingdom
 Elizabeth Learning Center, a public school in Cudahy, California, United States
 Eligibility in the Local Context, in the University of California admissions process
 Estherville–Lincoln Central Community School District in Iowa, United States

Other uses 
 Equal-loudness contour, a measure of sound pressure for which a listener perceives a constant loudness
 CCL19, a protein
 .elc, the filename suffix for Emacs Lisp compiled bytecode
 Ear lobe crease
 Early Learning Centre, a British children's retailer
 Early Learning Center, a Russian children's retailer
 Earth Law Center, an American environmental organization
 East Lancashire Coachbuilders, a defunct English bus bodywork builder
 Egyptian Labour Corps of the British Army, during the First World War
 ELC Electroconsult, an Italian engineering company
 ELC project, a French light tank prototype
 Elcho Island Airport, Northern Territory, Australia
 Enterprise life cycle
 Entity-level controls
 Entry Level Certificate, in England, Wales and Northern Ireland
 European Lutheran Conference
 Evangelical Lutheran Church (disambiguation)
 ExPRESS Logistics Carrier, of the International Space Station
 London Buses route ELC
 Event Link Controller, an implementation of autonomous peripheral operations in microcontrollers
 Embedded Linux Conference, a conference for companies and developers using Linux in embedded products